Phyllis Edness (born 8 April 1930, date of death unknown) was a Bermudian sprinter. The first Black Bermudian athlete, she competed in the women's 100 metres at the 1948 Summer Olympics, as part of an integrated Olympic team.

References

External links
 

1930 births
Year of death missing
Athletes (track and field) at the 1948 Summer Olympics
Bermudian female sprinters
Olympic athletes of Bermuda
Place of birth missing
Olympic female sprinters